Mahmada is a village in Samastipur district in Bihar state, India.

Mahmada is known for its farming, cultivation of mustard oil and sugar cane.
It is also known for growing fruits like Litchi and Mangoes.Mahmade Ibrahim afazo

References

Villages in Muzaffarpur district